The Battle of Skibo and Strathfleet was prompted by Clan Donald's invasion of the area around Dornoch in northern Scotland in 1480. Two attacks were repulsed by the local clans of Clan Sutherland and the Murrays of Aberscross.

Background
In 1455, John MacDonald of Islay, Earl of Ross had entered into a secret treaty, in which he agreed to become a vassal of Edward IV of England in return for help in conquering northern Scotland. When James III of Scotland discovered this agreement in 1476, he stripped John of his possessions on the mainland. John spent the next few years trying to reclaim the land he thought was his. When he lent most of his forces to his kinsman Donald Balloch of Islay to ravage the West Coast, John took 500-600 men around the north of Scotland to the Dornoch Firth on the east coast. It's not clear what his intention was, but he landed a few miles from Dunrobin Castle, home to Clan Sutherland who controlled much of the far north of Scotland.

Battles
At first the MacDonalds camped in front of Skibo Castle, a possession of the Bishop of Caithness. John Sutherland, 7th Earl of Sutherland sent a force under Neill Murray to watch the islanders. MacDonald began to ravage the country, so Murray attacked, driving off the invaders who lost a captain named Donald Dubh-na-Soirn, and 50 men.

In response to this defeat, MacDonald sent some of his men and "a company of men from Ross" up the coast to Loch Fleet, just south of Dunrobin. Sutherland sent his brother Robert and some men to meet the attackers "on the sands of Strathfleet". After a "fierce and bloody struggle", the island men and their allies were defeated "with great slaughter" and the survivors pursued as far as Bonar.

Aftermath
This was to be the final conflict between the MacDonalds and Sutherlands, as Sutherland married MacDonald's sister Margaret soon afterwards, sealing an alliance. However this heavy defeat may have been a factor in the conflict between John MacDonald and his son Angus Og, which resulted in the Battle of Bloody Bay in 1480 or 1483.

References

15th-century Scottish clan battles
1480 in Scotland
Clan Donald
History of the Scottish Highlands
Conflicts in 1480